Claire Steels (born 9 November 1986) grew up in the market town of Bourne, Lincolnshire in the United Kingdom. After completing education at Bourne Grammar School and University of Hull Steels became a British professional racing cyclist, who currently rides for UCI Women's Continental Team .

References

External links

1986 births
Living people
British female cyclists
Place of birth missing (living people)